The term federal city is a title for certain cities in Germany, Switzerland, and Russia.

Germany
In Germany, the former West German capital Bonn has been designated with the unique title of federal city (Bundesstadt). Since 28 April 1994, it is the secondary official residence of the President of Germany, the Chancellor of Germany, the Bundesrat (upper house), the primary official residence of six federal ministries, and approximately 20 federal authorities. This is merely a title, since Bonn is, like many other German cities, an independent city, but part of a state.

Russia
The Russian constitution states that it has three cities of federal importance (город федерального значения, gorod federalnogo znacheniya): Moscow, St. Petersburg and Sevastopol.

Switzerland
Federal city is the official title of Bern as it is the seat of the Swiss parliament and government.

Others
Some national capitals, like Astana, Bogotá, Brasília, Buenos Aires, Canberra, Caracas, Islamabad, Jakarta, Mexico City, Seoul, and Washington, among others, have a federal status, not belonging to any state or province (or being a state or province of their own, as is the case of Berlin, Delhi, Moscow, Oslo, Prague, Sofia, and other cities). Sometimes this is called a federal district.

See also
 Free city (disambiguation)
 Independent city

References

Capitals
Cities by type
Culture in Bonn
Culture in Bern